Noah's Ark Animal Sanctuary is a 501(c)3 nonprofit American domestic, wildlife, and exotic animal rescue and rehabilitation center. It is located on 250 acres in Locust Grove, Georgia and houses over 1,500 animals. Many of the center's animals were rescued from unlicensed owners, donated by circuses and zoos, or surrendered by individuals who were either unable to provide the proper care or did not want them.

History 

Founded by Jama and Charles Hedgecoth in 1978, the center was originally located on a small farm in Ellenwood. In 1990, Noah's Ark moved to a 122-acre property in Locust Grove, Georgia in part through the financial help of an anonymous benefactor. In 1992, they expanded the center to include the Noah's Ark Children Care Home for foster children.

Animals 
In total, Noah's Ark is home to 38 animal enclosures, each of which house a variety of animals that accumulate to over 100 different species. Inhabitants include animals such as Bengal tigers, American black bears, American mustangs, Bison, Porcupines, Sulcata tortoises, silver foxes, llamas, and ostriches. Noah's Ark is also home to a more unique bunch of animals such as Zuri the white Bengal tiger, Zipper the zonkey, Skunk the beefalo, and Grace the wolfdog hybrid.

A majority of the enclosures are located to the east of the sanctuary entrance and are easily walkable along the paved trails. While visiting Noah's Ark, the experience is typically self-guided so visitors can explore at their own pace, but guided tours are available as well. Most of the animal enclosures are marked with name tags and contain information pertaining to that specific animal.

BLT 

In 2001, the center acquired a trio of captive young animals (a bear cub, a lion cub, and a tiger cub) after they were confiscated from a convicted drug dealer during a raid at an Atlanta home. The three cubs were brought to Noah's Ark by the Georgia Department of Natural Resources with many health problems. When the animals were separated for treatment, the caretakers noticed a change in their behavior. The bonded cubs have been housed together in a special exhibit called "The Clubhouse" ever since.

Baloo

Baloo is a male American black bear weighing in over 800 pounds. Upon his arrival to Noah's ark, Baloo had to undergo surgery to remove the harness that he had long outgrown. The harness had become so severely ingrown to the extent that his growing body began to form around it, causing much pain.

Baloo currently enjoys being in the creek that runs along his enclosure or relaxing on the porch connected to the clubhouse. He also enjoys the occasional Tootsie Pop or Oreo as those are his favorite treats.

In 2021 Baloo, the only surviving BLT member, celebrated his 20th birthday in the park.

Leo

Leo was a male African lion that weighed in at 430 pounds. Leo also suffered physically from their treatment prior to arriving at Noah's Ark. He was kept in a cage too small to accommodate his growing frame and as a result, he sustained an abrasion to the nose, leaving behind a slight scar in his later years.

In late summer of 2016, caretakers noticed a change in Leo's behavior. During surgery some time later, it was found that Leo's liver had become compromised with a large amount of inoperable tumors. As a result of this discovery on August 11, Leo was put to sleep at the age of fifteen. He has been laid to rest in the trio's enclosure where a statue stands in his memory.

Shere Khan

Shere Khan was a male Bengal tiger that weighed in at 360 pounds. Like his brothers, Shere Khan arrived at Noah's Ark extremely malnourished and in need of specialized care. He healed quickly and soon grew into his role as the trio's most playful and mischievous sibling.

In late 2018, Shere Khan fell ill and in early December it was reported that he was in critical condition. On December 18, he died at 17 and a half years of age as a result of failing body functions. Shere Khan has been laid to rest next to his brother, Leo.

Facilities 
The sanctuary contains a welcome center, a gift shop, a playground, a picnic area, and a memorial garden.

Gallery

References

External links 
Official website

501(c)(3) organizations
Wildlife rehabilitation and conservation centers
Organizations established in 1978
1978 establishments in Georgia (U.S. state)